BAP Almirante Guise was a destroyer that served in the Russian, Estonian, and Peruvian navies during period from 1917 to 1954. Originally named Avtroil while in Russian service, in 1918 she was captured by Royal Navy and handed over to Estonia where she was renamed Lennuk. The ship participated in Estonian War of Independence, and served in Estonian navy until 1933, when she was sold to Peru where she was renamed  Almirante Guise.

Service history
Following the collapse of the Russian Empire and the intervention into the Russian Civil War by the Allies, Avtroil, then under Bolshevik control, was captured by British cruisers and destroyers in the Baltic in December 1918. The ship was transferred to Estonia, from whom she was purchased by the Peruvian Navy in 1933. The ship was renamed  Almirante Guise and served with the Peruvian navy until she was scrapped in 1954.

References
 

 Jane's Fighting Ships 1938, p. 388.

External links

 

Izyaslav-class destroyers of the Peruvian Navy
Ships built in Russia
1915 ships
World War I destroyers of Russia
Destroyers of the Estonian Navy
World War II destroyers of Peru